Rush Township is a township in Northumberland County, Pennsylvania, United States. The population at the 2010 Census was 1,122, a decline from the figure of 1,189 tabulated in 2000.

Geography

According to the United States Census Bureau, the township has a total area of 27.4 square miles (70.9 km2), of which 26.8 square miles (69.3 km2)  is land and 0.6 square mile (1.6 km2)  (2.23%) is water.

Demographics

As of the census of 2000, there were 1,189 people, 443 households, and 330 families residing in the township.  The population density was 44.4 people per square mile (17.1/km2).  There were 469 housing units at an average density of 17.5/sq mi (6.8/km2).  The racial makeup of the township was 98.23% White, 0.25% African American, 0.67% Asian, 0.08% Pacific Islander, 0.17% from other races, and 0.59% from two or more races. Hispanic or Latino of any race were 0.25% of the population.

There were 443 households, out of which 30.2% had children under the age of 18 living with them, 66.8% were married couples living together, 5.0% had a female householder with no husband present, and 25.5% were non-families. 22.1% of all households were made up of individuals, and 10.8% had someone living alone who was 65 years of age or older.  The average household size was 2.68 and the average family size was 3.16.

In the township the population was spread out, with 26.4% under the age of 18, 6.3% from 18 to 24, 25.1% from 25 to 44, 27.7% from 45 to 64, and 14.5% who were 65 years of age or older.  The median age was 40 years. For every 100 females, there were 98.8 males.  For every 100 females age 18 and over, there were 101.6 males.

The median income for a household in the township was $43,098, and the median income for a family was $48,542. Males had a median income of $30,074 versus $23,077 for females. The per capita income for the township was $21,055.  About 2.2% of families and 5.1% of the population were below the poverty line, including 7.9% of those under age 18 and 3.1% of those age 65 or over.

References

Populated places established in 1784
Townships in Northumberland County, Pennsylvania
Townships in Pennsylvania